Ines Brodmann (born 1 April 1985) is a Swiss orienteering competitor and world champion. She won a gold medal in the relay at the 2012 World Orienteering Championships in Lausanne, together with Judith Wyder and Simone Niggli-Luder.

References

External links

1985 births
Living people
Swiss orienteers
Female orienteers
Foot orienteers
World Orienteering Championships medalists
21st-century Swiss women